Michael Ayrton (20 February 1921 – 16 November 1975) was a British artist and writer, renowned as a painter, printmaker, sculptor and designer, and also as a critic, broadcaster and novelist. His varied output of sculptures, illustrations, poems and stories reveals an obsession with flight, myths, mirrors and mazes.

He was also a stage and costume designer, working with John Minton on the 1942 John Gielgud production of Macbeth at the age of nineteen, and a book designer and illustrator for Wyndham Lewis's The Human Age trilogy. An exhibition, 'Word and Image' (National Book League 1971), explored Lewis's and Ayrton's literary and artistic connections. He also collaborated with Constant Lambert and William Golding.

Life and career

Ayrton was born Michael Ayrton Gould, son of the writer Gerald Gould and the Labour politician Barbara Ayrton, and took his mother's maiden name professionally. His maternal grandmother was the electrical engineer and inventor, Hertha Marks Ayrton. In his teens during the 1930s he studied art at Heatherley School of Fine Art and St John's Wood Art School, then in Paris under Eugène Berman, where he shared a studio with John Minton. He travelled to Spain and attempted to enlist on the Republican side in the Spanish Civil War, but was rejected for being under-age.

In the 1940s, Ayrton participated in the BBC's popular radio programme The Brains Trust. He married the novelist and cookery writer Elisabeth Balchin in 1942 following her divorce from Nigel Balchin a year earlier.

Beginning in 1961, Michael Ayrton wrote and created many works associated with the myths of the Minotaur and Daedalus, the legendary inventor and maze builder, including bronze sculpture and the pseudo-autobiographical novel The Maze Maker (Holt, Rinehart and Winston, 1967). He also wrote and illustrated a satirical novel, Tittivulus or The Verbiage Collector (Max Reinhardt, 1953; designed by Will Carter), an account of the career of a minor devil whose original remit was to collect slovenly performances of the Divine Office in monasteries, but who develops, as the centuries pass, into a collector of all kinds of verbiage, and finally, in the modern age, mounts a fascistic revolution in Hell.  Ayrton was also the author of several non-fiction works on fine art, including Aspects of British Art (Collins, 1947).

He died in 1975, survived by his wife. In 1977, Birmingham Museum and Art Gallery organised a major retrospective exhibition of his work which subsequently went on tour.

His work is in several important collections including the Tate Gallery, London, National Portrait Gallery, London, Museum of Modern Art, New York, Fry Art Gallery, Essex. Ayrton's work was also featured at the Whitechapel Gallery in London, in an exhibition running from September to October 1955.

In 2021, the artist's centenary year, there have been exhibitions of his work (Celebrating Michael Ayrton at 
The Lightbox Gallery, Woking, UK; A Singular Obsession: A Centenary Celebration of the work of Michael Ayrton, Fry Art Gallery, Saffron Walden, UK; Michael Ayrton's Minotaur Suite, Kruizenga Art Museum, Michigan, USA), and a new illustrated monograph, Michael Ayrton: Ideas Images Reflections.

Selected writings
 1945: Poems of Death. Verses chosen by Phoebe Pool, Lithographs by Michael Ayrton.  London: Frederick Muller Ltd.
 1946: British Drawing. London: Collins ASIN B00149X1DM
 1947: Aspects of British Art. London: Collins
 1953: Tittivulus or The Verbiage Collector. London: Max Reinhardt
 1957: Golden Sections. London: Methuen
 1962: The Testament of Daedalus.  London: Methuen. with a foreword by Rex Warner; reprinted, London: Robin Clark, 1991. 
 1967: The Maze Maker: a novel. New York: Holt, Rinehart and Winston
 1969: Berlioz: A singular obsession. London: BBC Publications
 1969: Giovanni Pisano: Sculptor. London: Thames & Hudson
 1971: The Rudiments of Paradise: Various essays on various arts. London: Secker & Warburg
 1972: Fabrications. London: Secker & Warburg. / New York: Holt, Rinehart and Winston. 1973

See also
Ankylosing spondylitis
Icarus complex

References

Further reading
 James Laver, Paintings by Michael Ayrton (1948. Grey Walls Press, London)
 C. P. Snow, Michael Ayrton Drawings and Sculpture (1962)
 Cannon-Brookes, Peter, Michael Ayrton: an illustrated commentary (1978. Birmingham Museums and Art Gallery)
 Peter Tucker, 'The book illustrations of Michael Ayrton', in The Private Library; 3rd series, 9:1 (1986 Spring), p. 2–52
 Hopkins, Justine Michael Ayrton: a biography (1994. Deutsch, London)
 Nyenhuis, Jacob E., Myth and the Creative Process: Michael Ayrton and the myth of Daedalus, the Maze Maker (2003. Wayne State University Press, Detroit)

External links

 www.michaelayrton.com - website of The Estate of Michael Ayrton
 
 Works in Tate collection

1921 births
1975 deaths
20th-century British printmakers
20th-century English male writers
20th-century English sculptors
20th-century English male artists
20th-century English novelists
20th-century English painters
English male painters
Alumni of St John's Wood Art School
Alumni of the Heatherley School of Fine Art
Michael
British people of Polish-Jewish descent
English broadcasters
English printmakers
English male novelists
English male sculptors
Modern artists
People from St Pancras, London
Sculptors from London